Lorenzo Vigas Castes (born 1967) is a Venezuelan director, screenwriter and film producer.

Biography

Education 
Born in Mérida, the son of the painter Oswaldo Vigas, Vigas graduated in molecular biology at the University of Tampa.
 
In 1995 he studied cinema at New York University and started directing several experimental films.

Career 
Back in Venezuela in 1998, he directed the RCTV documentary series Expedición and various documentaries and commercials. Located in Mexico, in 2003 he directed the short film Los elefantes nunca olvidan (Elephants Never Forget), produced by Guillermo Arriaga and presented at the Cannes Film Festival.

With his first feature film From Afar, Vigas won the Golden Lion for best film of the 72nd edition of the Venice Film Festival. In July 2016 he was named as a member of the main competition jury for the 73rd Venice International Film Festival where he premiered a documentary on his father titled "The Orchid Seller".

Filmography
 The Orchid Seller (El vendedor de orquídeas), 2016 (Documentary)
 From Afar (Desde allá), 2015
 Los elefantes nunca olvidan, 2004 (Short film)
 The Box (2021)

References

External links 
 

1967 births
People from Mérida, Mérida
Venezuelan film directors
Venezuelan film producers
Venezuelan screenwriters
Living people
University of Tampa alumni
New York University alumni
Directors of Golden Lion winners